Apoorva Raagangal is a 1975 Indian Tamil-language romantic drama film written and directed by K. Balachander. It stars Kamal Haasan, Sundarrajan, Srividya and Jayasudha, while Nagesh and Rajinikanth, in his feature film debut, play supporting roles. The film revolves around Prasanna (Haasan) who falls in love with the much older Bhairavi (Srividya) while Bhairavi's daughter Ranjani (Jayasudha) is drawn to Prasanna's father Mahendran (Sundarrajan).

Apoorva Raagangals theme was based on a riddle featured in the Indian folktale collection Baital Pachisi about a king marrying a woman and his son marrying her mother, and Vetala, the riddler asking Vikramaditya what would be their kinship relations if these couples were to beget children. The film was produced by V. Govindarajan and J. Duraisamy under the Kalakendra Films banner, photographed by B. S. Lokanath and edited by N. R. Kittu; the music is composed by M. S. Viswanathan. Unlike many contemporaneous Tamil films, it was shot entirely in actual houses for their interiors without building sets, as Balachander wanted to convey a more authentic narration.

Apoorva Raagangal was released on 15 August 1975. Despite exploring the concept of relationships between people with wide age gaps, which challenged Indian social mores, it received critical acclaim and became a commercial success, and a breakthrough for Srividya and Haasan. The film won three National Film Awards, including Best Feature Film in Tamil, and three Filmfare Awards South in the Tamil branch: Best Feature Film, Best Director for Balachander and Best Actor for Haasan, and a Special Award for Srividya. It was remade in Telugu as Thoorpu Padamara (1976) where Srividya and Nagesh reprised their roles, and in Hindi by Balachander as Ek Nai Paheli (1984) where Haasan reprised his role.

Plot 
Prasanna is a young man who indulges in several revolutionary activities against the wishes of his father Mahendran, a widower. After Prasanna tells him that, due to the price of rice increasing, he stole rice from a lorry, distributed it to the poor and set fire to the lorry before the police arrived, a disgusted Mahendran helps the police arrest him, widening the already existing rift between them. After his release, Prasanna opts to stay away from his hometown, Bangalore, and reaches Madras.

One day, Prasanna is beaten up for abusing the passengers of a car that splashed water on him. Carnatic singer Bhairavi, returning home after a katcheri, notices him lying unconscious on the roadside, takes him home and her doctor friend Suri treats him. At Bhairavi's request, Prasanna continues to live in her house even after he recovers. He slowly develops passionate feelings for her even though she is much older.

Before Prasanna's arrival, Bhairavi's daughter Ranjani, who believes she was adopted, learns that she is actually Bhairavi's biological daughter born out of wedlock. Unable to digest her mother's hypocrisy, she runs away from home and meets Mahendran in Bangalore while trying to sell some items. She ends up staying at his house for a few days at his request. Impressed by his love for his deceased wife, his longing for his son Prasanna who left him, and his commitment to help her, she expresses a desire to marry him, despite the fact that he is old enough to be her father.

Both Bhairavi and Mahendran reject Prasanna and Ranjani's proposals, citing their age difference and other situations, but with perseverance, Prasanna and Ranjani are able to convince them that their respective marriages could work. Bhairavi is forced to accept Prasanna's proposal when he ends his revolutionary activities and takes up music for her sake, becoming a mridangam player. Prasanna is happy that Bhairavi has accepted his proposal, but Pandiyan, her ex-lover and Ranjani's father, turns up to meet her and to apologise. Prasanna does not allow this and, as Pandiyan is dying from blood cancer, takes him away for treatment at his place. He tells Pandiyan of his plan to marry Bhairavi and seeks his co-operation. Pandiyan agrees not to meet her.

Mahendran, seeing an advertisement placed by Bhairavi about her missing daughter, comes to meet Bhairavi at her house and sees Prasanna's photograph there. He realises they are in love. Mahendran advertises for his missing son. Bhairavi sees the advertisement so she tells Prasanna to get his father's consent before marrying her. They both meet Mahendran, who introduces Ranjani as Prasanna's future mother since she is his future wife. A riddle is explained: Prasanna's wife will be the mother of his father's wife, meaning Ranjani will be the mother-in-law of her own mother and Mahendran will be the son-in-law of his own son. Mahendran asks Prasanna how this riddle is going to be cleared in their case.

During Bhairavi's next katcheri, where Prasanna is a mridangam player, she sings "Kelviyin Nayagane, Indha Kelvikku Badhil Edhayya?" (Oh hero of the question, what is the answer to this question?). Ranjani changes her mind and joins her mother by singing at the concert. Observing this, Prasanna also changes his mind and joins his father. When all these issues are cleared, Pandiyan sends a note to Bhairavi in the middle of the katcheri. Bhairavi searches for him after it ends and finds him dead with a note in his hand, wishing her well with Prasanna. She erases the kumkuma from her forehead to declare herself a widow and leaves with Ranjani, while Prasanna joins Mahendran.

Cast 

 Kamal Haasan as Prasanna
 Sundarrajan as Mahendran
 Srividya as Bhairavi
 Jayasudha as Ranjani
 Nagesh as Suri / Hari
 Rajinikanth as Pandiyan

Kannadasan, Jaishankar and members of the Madras-based United Amateur Artistes make "friendly appearances".

Production

Development 
The Indian folktale collection Baital Pachisi features many stories where the ghost-like being Vetala poses many riddles to Vikramaditya. In the final riddle, a king marries a woman and his son marries her mother; Vetala asks, "If these couples were to beget children, what would be their kinship relations?" and Vikramaditya keeps quiet since it does not have an answer. This riddle inspired K. Balachander to write the script of Apoorva Raagangal, which he would also direct. V. Govindarajan and J. Duraisamy produced the film under their production banner, Kalakendra Films. B. S. Lokanath was chosen as the cinematographer, N. R. Kittu as the editor, and Ramasamy as the art director.

Before the film's release, author N. R. Dasan accused Balachander of plagiarising Verum Mann, a story he had written for the magazine Kannadasan. The matter was taken to the Madras High Court, and Dasan won the case. Although he did not seek money, the judge ordered Balachander to pay him  as a fine.

Casting 

Kamal Haasan was cast as the protagonist Prasanna. He spent seven months learning to play the mridangam required for the role. The film was the debut of Shivaji Rao Gaekwad, who later became one of Tamil cinema's biggest stars, Rajinikanth. He was a student at the Madras Film Institute, when Balachander, who came there, met him. Balachander was impressed by his appearance: his "fragile" health, "powerful" eyes, "chiselled" face and dark skin and did not view them as negatives. He sought to "give him a good role, and see what can be drawn out of him". The script of Apoorva Raagangal had been readied, and Balachander wanted Gaekwad to play a "small but interesting part", which he agreed to. The part was that of Bhairavi's (Srividya) ex-lover Pandiyan.

As Gaekwad, who primarily spoke Kannada and his native Marathi, was only "tangentially familiar" with Tamil, Balachander advised him to learn the language. Gaekwad practised by speaking only Tamil with his friend Raja Bahaddur, a native Tamil speaker; he mastered the language in 20 days. After meeting Balachander again, and impressing him with his Tamil, he was given the part. When it came to giving Gaekwad a screen name, Balachander had three options: Rajinikanth, Chandrakanth and Srikanth. He chose Rajinikanth, the name of A. V. M. Rajan's character from his 1966 film Major Chandrakanth; the name means "colour of night", referring to Gaekwad's skin colour, though it was misspelled in the credits as "Rajanikanth".

Filming 
Unlike many contemporaneous Tamil films, Apoorva Raagangal was shot entirely in actual houses for interiors without building sets, as Balachander wanted a more authentic narration to be conveyed. With Lokanath's help, he found houses which belonged to A. V. Meiyappan's family members, one of which was Meiyappan's house, Chettiar Bungalow. For Prasanna's look, Haasan kept his moustache thin and hair long, and had him sporting bell-bottoms and polo shirts. According to historian G. Dhananjayan, the song "Athisaya Raagam" was filmed at the cashew farms of VGP Golden Beach; however, Roshne Balasubramanian of The Indian Express says it was filmed at the Theosophical Society Adyar. The camera was moved manually by the cameraperson at this time, without the use of a dolly. In a 2000 interview with Rediff, Jayasudha, who portrayed Bhairavi's daughter Ranjani, recalled that it was hard portraying a girl in love with the much older Mahendran (Sundarrajan): "Balachander Sir was a very tough taskmaster. He would not be satisfied unless he got 100 per cent from you. He used to reprimand me and shout at me if I messed up." She also had to wear a sari and needed help since she had never worn one before.

The scene where Pandiyan opens the gate of Bhairavi's house was filmed at a house in 1st Crescent Park Road, Gandhi Nagar. The scene was shot on 27 March 1975, the same day that Balachander gave Rajinikanth his name; it was approved  after only five or six takes. For the character's looks, Rajinikanth sported stubble and wore a loose-fitting suit consisting of a dusty coat, loosely worn tie, untucked shirt and trousers; his make-up was done by R. Sundaramoorthy. During the initial stages of  principal photography, Rajinikanth found Balachander's directing methods very difficult to follow. Nagesh, who portrayed the doctor Suri who lives a double life as a drunkard named Hari, observed his difficulty and told him, "Don't get tensed up. Just imitate whatever Balachander is doing. That's what I’m doing as well!" After listening to Nagesh's advice, it became easier for Rajinikanth to complete his portions in the film. For the scene where Suri speaks to his own shadow, it was Nagesh's idea by making the character utter "Cheers" and throw the glass at his own shadow.

Themes 
Apoorva Raagangal explores the concept of relationships between couples with a large disparity in their ages, which challenged Indian social mores. Although it is based on a Baital Pachisi riddle, it has frequently been compared to the American film 40 Carats (1973), which tells the story of a widow who falls in love with a much younger man. In Apoorva Raagangal, Ranjani often poses the riddle "Ennudaya appa yaarukku maamanaro, avarudaya marumagalin appa en maganukku maamanar. Appa avarukkum enakkum enna uravu?" (My father is father-in-law to someone; that person's daughter-in-law's father is my son's father-in-law. What is the relationship between him and me?), summing up the film's theme. While the source riddle in Baital Pachisi does not have an answer, G. Dhananjayan believes the answer to the film's riddle is, "for a husband, the relation is his wife and for the wife, the relation is her husband".

Because one of the lead characters is a Carnatic singer, the film uses various Carnatic music terms as placeholders to carry forward the narrative. The first is "sarali varisai", referring to the beginner lessons that Carnatic music students learn; "mohanam", meaning enchantment or infatuation, appears when Prasanna falls in love; and the film ends with "mangalam", referring to the closing part of a katcheri. The female lead characters are named after the Carnatic ragas Bhairavi and Ranjani. V. Ramji of the Hindu Tamil Thisai believes the scene where Prasanna beats up a man for not standing still when "Jana Gana Mana" (the Indian national anthem) is playing, reflects Balachander's penchant for depicting patriotism. During Pandiyan's first appearance, "Sruthi Bedham" (Change of Sruthi) appears. Historian Mohan Raman said that by including these words, Balachander "meant that the man who changed the course of the story would also the change the industry". Anand Kumar RS, of The News Minute, however, says the term which also means "pitch distortion", was used to symbolise Pandiyan making "an entry at the wrong time".

Balachander said Pandiyan's first shot was deliberate and representative of Rajinikanth making his first appearance in cinema. According to critic Naman Ramachandran, the character is not entirely villainous despite popular belief since he commits no villainous act on screen. Having deserted Bhairavi after impregnating her offscreen, in the present he voluntarily agrees to stay away from her after realising she is content with Prasanna. Ramachandran said three things that happen soon after Pandiyan's death prove he is not a villain: the music playing in the background is the type usually played when a sympathetic character dies; Bhairavi erases her kumkuma, like any Indian woman would upon becoming a widow; and Pandiyan is found to be holding a note saying his last wish is to see the raga and tala meet, referring to the proposed joint performance of Bhairavi the singer and Prasanna the  mridangam  player. Dhananjayan considers the entire story of the film is conveyed through the song "Kelviyin Nayagane".

Music 
The film's soundtrack was composed by M. S. Viswanathan; the lyrics were written by Kannadasan. It was released as an LP on the  EMI label with an HMV logo. Two songs are ragamalikas, i.e. compositions having different verses set to different ragas. "Yezhu Swarangalukkul" is set in Panthuvarali, Kambhoji, Sindhu Bhairavi and Ranjani. "Athisaya Raagam" begins in Mahati, and shifts to Bhairavi with the line "Oru Puram Paarthaal". "Kelviyin Nayagane" is set in a single raga, Darbari Kanada.

Singer M. Balamuralikrishna recalled in a 2006 interview, "I ran into [M. S. Viswanathan] in AIR who was setting music for the movie. As the story revolved around strange relationships, the music director wanted to introduce new ragas to go with the ambient theme. I offered my `Mahati' scale and the records created then are history now." "Yezhu Swarangalukkul" became "the rage everywhere" and was a breakthrough for its singer Vani Jairam.

Release 
Apoorva Raagangal was released on 15 August 1975. When the film was released in Bangalore's Kapali theatre, Rajinikanth and Raja Bahaddur went to watch it. The latter recalled, "Nobody knew that he had acted in a film, We saw the film. When we came out, he started crying. I asked him, "Why are you crying?" He said, "I'm on the screen finally, I'm so happy. These are tears of joy". Despite being released on the same day as Sholay, which went on to become the highest-grossing Indian film at the time, Apoorva Raagangal became a box office success, completing a 100-day theatrical run. On its 100th day, Balachander held a ceremony in Madras to reward the cast and crew. The ceremony was attended by M. Karunanidhi, then the chief minister of Tamil Nadu.

Critical reception 
Apoorva Raagangal received critical acclaim. On 22 August 1975, The Hindu said, "K. Balachander has contributed a unique story, dialogues and superb direction in Kala Kendra's [Apoorva Raagangal]. A film with a revolutionary offbeat theme it provides poetic experience". The reviewer praised the performances of the main cast, Nagesh's dual role performance as a doctor and a drunkard, and called Rajinikanth "dignified and impressive". They also appreciated the music and Vani Jairam's singing, and Lokanath's cinematography. The reviewer concluded, "Some of the most memorable scenes in this outstanding film emerge from the clash of personalities between the two odd pairs. The end should satisfy even conservative tastes and carries a subtle message about loving too well but not wisely." On 31 August, M. S. Udhayamurthy, writing for the Tamil magazine Ananda Vikatan, appreciated the film overwhelmingly for its quality, calling it one big musical concert happening before his eyes. He said he got so involved with the characters, to the point of forgetting they were artistes who were enacting their roles and started living with and empathising with them at the end. On the same day, Kanthan of Kalki praised the film for the screenplay and characters being innovative, along with the cast performances and music. Though some reviewers criticised Rajinikanth's performance and told him to improve, he complemented them over the reviewers praising his performance.

Awards

Remakes 
In 1976, Apoorva Raagangal was remade by Dasari Narayana Rao in Telugu as Thoorpu Padamara; Srividya and Nagesh reprised their roles. In 1984, the film was remade in Hindi as Ek Nai Paheli by Balachander himself, with Haasan reprising his role.

Legacy 
Apoorva Raagangal became a landmark in Tamil cinema, and a breakthrough for Srividya and Haasan. The Times of India wrote that it was "innovative for the way it brought out the O Henry sort of twist in the plot. [...] It was experimental in bringing out complexities involved in relationships and how certain relationships, no matter what, do not leave you and emerge abruptly to create new equations." Chitra Mahesh of The Hindu wrote that it "was bold and unapologetic about love transcending age, caste and all barriers one can think of". In 2011, after Balachander had been given the Dadasaheb Phalke Award, Pavithra Srinivasan of Rediff called the film one of his best and wrote, "Many filmmakers of that time would have hesitated to touch a subject like this, particularly at a time when relationships were still being gingerly tested on celluloid. But not K Balachander." The scene where a drunk Suri talks to his own shadow and hurls the empty glass at it while saying "Cheers" led to filmgoers imitating him and throwing cups on the lobby walls in theatres.

In 2003, Rediff wrote, "In an era where every other moviemaker claims to have come up with a daring, original, premise, this 28-year-old film is worth remembering. A trademark K Balachander film, this was the first to showcase Kamal's histrionic abilities." In 2015, Tamil Canadian journalist D. B. S. Jeyaraj wrote, "Though Nagesh has acted in many different roles in Balachander films, one sequence that is perhaps best remembered is the drunkard-doctor of [Apoorva Raagangal]." Director Mani Ratnam credited Balachander, with Mahendran and C. V. Sridhar, for "weaning the audience away from theatricality", citing a scene in Apoorva Raagangal as an example: "The shadow of the woman upstairs drying her hair falls across the path of the rebellious young man sneaking out of the house. It is enough to stop him. This scene could have been dramatic, with lot of dialogue. Instead you get a silent visual." The film was novelised in 2008 by Vikatan Prasuram.

Apoorva Raagangal has been referenced in other Rajinikanth films. In Athisaya Piravi (1990), Yama (Vinu Chakravarthy) has to restore Kaalai (Rajinikanth) to life by putting him in the body of a lookalike. He shows him numerous alternatives, one of which is Pandiyan from Apoorva Raagangal; Kaalai refuses after learning that Pandiyan is going to die of blood cancer. In Petta (2019), Kaali (Rajinikanth) opens the gates to a house in a scene that director Karthik Subbaraj confirmed was inspired by Pandiyan's first scene in Apoorva Raagangal.

References

Bibliography

External links 
 

1970s Tamil-language films
1975 films
1975 romantic drama films
Best Tamil Feature Film National Film Award winners
Films about music and musicians
Films directed by K. Balachander
Films involved in plagiarism controversies
Films scored by M. S. Viswanathan
Films whose cinematographer won the Best Cinematography National Film Award
Films with screenplays by K. Balachander
Indian black-and-white films
Indian romantic drama films
Sexuality and age in fiction
Tamil films remade in other languages